Sülzgürtel is a terminus and interchange station on the Cologne Stadtbahn lines 13 and 18 in Cologne. The station lies at the junction of Luxemburger Straße and Sülzgürtel, Sülz in the district of Lindenthal.

The station was opened on 20 January 1898 and today consists of two bay platforms with together four rail tracks, whose connection at the junction is not used for regular service. The platform for line 13 is in the middle of Sülzgürtel north of Luxemburger Straße, while the platform for line 18 is in the middle of Luxemburger Straße, to the west of Sülzgürtel.

With the planned extension of line 13, the tracks along Sülzgürtel will be extended across Luxemburger Straße, and line 13 will get a new terminus further along the Gürtel. A partially tunneled extension is also in discussion, which could lead to Sülzgürtel being replaced by a new underground station.

See also 
 List of Cologne KVB stations

References

External links 
 station info page 
 station diagram map 

Cologne KVB stations
Lindenthal, Cologne
Railway stations in Germany opened in 1898